Napoleon Buck House was a historic home located near Waverly, Lafayette County, Missouri.  It was built about 1873, and was a two-story, central passage plan, vernacular Greek Revival style brick I-house. It had a two-story rear ell supporting a double-gallery porch. It featured segmental arched openings. The house is no longer in existence.

It was listed on the National Register of Historic Places in 1997.

References

Houses on the National Register of Historic Places in Missouri
Greek Revival houses in Missouri
Houses completed in 1873
Houses in Lafayette County, Missouri
National Register of Historic Places in Lafayette County, Missouri